Desmond Cyril Derbyshire (10 September 1924 – 19 December 2007) was a linguist who specialized in Carib languages.

Background

He is best known for his work on Hixkaryana, known for its object–verb–subject word order. Derbyshire's study of the language (as a linguist with the Summer Institute of Linguistics) resulted in the first description in the linguistics literature of a language with this word order as its default.

The most surprising story Derbyshire told of the long period of work in the Hixkaryana village of remote northern Brazil concerned a day in November 1965, during the visit by then New York's US Senator Robert F. Kennedy. The recounting of that three-day visit included how Senator Kennedy declared his decision to run for President of the United States.

References

Pullum, Geoffrey K., Obituary: Desmond Derbyshire (1924–2007), 3 Jan 2008, LINGUIST List.

Linguists from England
1924 births
2007 deaths
People from Durham, England
British expatriates in Brazil